Felix Aronovich Novikov (3 August 1927 – 18 August 2022) was a Soviet and Russian architect. In 1991, he was awarded the honorary title of People's Architect of the USSR, becoming the last awardee of the title.

His architectural projects span the period between the 1950s and the 1980s. The earlier ones belong to the mainstream tradition of the Soviet architecture, however, starting from the 1960s, Novikov's projects became innovative. His main projects included Krasnopresnenskaya metro station (1954, together with Victor Yegerev, M. Konstantinov, and I. Pokrovsky), residential buildings on embankments of the Yauza (1950s, together with Yegerev and Pokrovsky), and the building of the Palace of Young Pioneers, all in Moscow.

Novikov died in Rochester, New York on 18 August 2022, at the age of 95.

Literature
 Berkovich, Gary. Reclaiming a History. Jewish Architects in Imperial Russia and the USSR. Volume 4. Modernized Socialist Realism: 1955–1991. Weimar und Rostock: Grunberg Verlag. 2022. P.53. .

References

1927 births
2022 deaths
20th-century Russian architects
Russian architects
Soviet architects
Soviet urban planners
Russian urban planners
Recipients of the USSR State Prize
Architects from Baku